Anders Leonard Bygdén (3 March 1844 – 22 November 1929) was a Swedish historian and author.

Biography
He was born on 3 March 1844 in Spånga, Sweden to Olof Bygdén. Bygdén enrolled at Uppsala University in 1863 and graduated with a B.A. in 1870 and Ph.D. in 1872. The university then hired him as an associate professor of philosophy. He published  from 1923 to 1928. He died on 22 November 1929 in Uppsala, Sweden.

Publications
Förteckning över Norrlands nations i Uppsala bibliotek (1876) 
Uppsala universitets biblioteks accessionskatalog (1881)
Svenskt anonym- och pseudonymlexikon (1898–1915)
Hernösands stifts herdaminne (1923–1928)

References

External links

1844 births
1929 deaths
20th-century Swedish historians
Uppsala University alumni
Academic staff of Uppsala University
19th-century Swedish historians